{{DISPLAYTITLE:Ka band}}

The Ka band (pronounced as either "kay-ay band" or "ka band") is a portion of the microwave part of the electromagnetic spectrum defined as  frequencies in the range 26.5–40 gigahertz (GHz), i.e. wavelengths from slightly over one centimeter down to 7.5 millimeters. The band is called Ka, short for "K-above" because it is the upper part of the original NATO K band, which was split into three bands because of the presence of the atmospheric water vapor resonance peak at 22.24 GHz (1.35 cm), which made the center unusable for long range transmission.  The 30/20 GHz band is used in communications satellite uplinks in either the 27.5 GHz and 31 GHz bands, and high-resolution, close-range targeting radars aboard military airplanes. Some frequencies in this radio band are used for vehicle speed detection by law enforcement. The Kepler Mission used this frequency range to downlink the scientific data collected by the space telescope.

The designation "Ka-band" is from Kurz-above, which stems from the German word kurz meaning "short".

In satellite communications, the Ka band allows higher bandwidth communication. It was first used in the experimental ACTS Gigabit Satellite Network, and is currently used for high-throughput satellite Internet access in geostationary orbit (GEO) by the Inmarsat I-5 system and Kacific K-1 satellite; in low Earth orbit (LEO) by the SpaceX Starlink system and the Iridium Next satellite series; it is also use in medium Earth orbit (MEO) by the SES O3b system; and the James Webb Space Telescope.

Planned future satellite projects using Ka-band include Amazon's Project Kuiper satellite internet constellation in LEO, SES's multi-orbit satellite internet system of the SES-17 satellite in GEO (launched in October 2021; in position and fully operational in June 2022) and O3b mPOWER constellation in MEO (first two satellites launched December 2022, nine more 2023-2024, and starting service in Q3 2023).

The frequency is commonly used by cosmic microwave background experiments. The 5th generation mobile networks  will also partially overlap with Ka band (28, 38, and 60 GHz).

See also 
 Saorsat, Ireland satellite television on Ka band
 Ka band waves

References

Microwave bands
Satellite broadcasting